Waud is a surname. Notable people with the name include:

 Alfred Waud (1828–1891), English-American artist and illustrator
 Brian Waud (1837–1889), English cricketer
 Daryl Waud (born 1993), Canadian football defensive lineman
 Martin Waud (born 1981), Caymanian football defender
 William Waud (1832–1878), English-American artist and illustrator